The 2008 Winnipeg Blue Bombers season was the 51st season for the team in the Canadian Football League and their 76th overall. The Blue Bombers attempted to win their 11th Grey Cup championship, but they lost in the Eastern Semi-Final game against the Edmonton Eskimos, who crossed over from the West.

Offseason

CFL draft
The Winnipeg Blue Bombers moved up in the CFL draft without even making a trade. The Bombers moved into the sixth spot in the CFL's college entry draft when the Montreal Alouettes lost their first choice. The Alouettes lost the choice because the club exceeded its salary cap by more than $100,000.

Transactions
 On May 20, the Bombers officially signed former U.S. college stars Bryan Randall and Cleveland McCoy.
 On Tuesday, May 27, Milt Stegall announced that he will not participate in the Winnipeg Blue Bombers training camp after undergoing knee surgery May 2.
 The Bombers also announced they've released veteran cornerback Juran Bolden. The 33-year-old Tampa native spent the 2007 CFL season with Winnipeg, but didn't play in the Grey Cup due to a hamstring injury. The six-foot-three, 210-pound Bolden was originally a fourth-round pick of the NFL's Atlanta Falcons in 1996. Bolden twice played for the Falcons ('96–'97, 2002–'03). Other NFL teams included the Carolina Panthers ('98), Kansas City Chiefs ('99), Jacksonville Jaguars ('04) and Tampa Bay Buccaneers ('05–'06).

Regular season
On September 12 at Rogers Centre, Milt Stegall became the most prolific receiver in the history of the CFL. The slotback caught a 92-yard pass at 9:02 in the second quarter to raise his career total to 14,983, breaking the mark of 14,891 yards previously held by former Stampeders receiver Allen Pitts. Stegall took a pass from Kevin Glenn and scored a touchdown, his second of the game. It put the Bombers ahead 28–3. The touchdown was Stegall's 14,983rd career receiving yard. With the record broken, the announced crowd of 28,453 stood to applaud the milestone.

Season standings

Transactions
September 9: Winnipeg acquired middle linebacker Zeke (And Destroy) Moreno and a conditional draft pick from Hamilton for its first-round draft pick in 2009 and the rights to Canadian defensive lineman Corey Mace.

Season schedule

Roster

Statistics

Offence

Passing

Rushing

Receiving

Milt Stegall Has 14,750 receiving yards

Defence

Awards and records
 Doug Brown, James P. McCaffrey Trophy

CFL All-Stars
 Dan Goodspeed, Offensive Tackle
 Doug Brown, Defensive Tackle
 Zeke Moreno, Linebacker

CFL Eastern All-Stars
 Doug Brown, CFL Eastern All-Star
 Dan Goodspeed, CFL Eastern All-Star, Offence
 Kelly Malveaux, CFL Eastern All-Star, Defence
 Zeke Moreno, CFL Eastern All-Star, Defence
 Fred Reid, CFL Eastern All-Star, Offence
 Gavin Walls, CFL Eastern All-Star, Defence

Milestones

Playoffs

East Semi-Final
Date and time: Saturday, November 8, 12:00 PM Central Standard TimeVenue: Canad Inns Stadium, Winnipeg, Manitoba

References

Winnipeg Blue Bombers
Winnipeg Blue Bombers seasons